The Coast to Coast Athletic Conference, formerly Capital Athletic Conference, currently sponsors 18 sports in which 21, 8 current, athletic programs have competed in. Up until the 2019-2020 season, championships were under the branding Capital Athletic Conference (CAC), from the 2020-21 season on, championships are now under the Coast to Coast Athletic Conference (C2C) branding.

Fall Sports

Men's Cross Country

Results
The inaugural season of men's cross country was in the 1991-92 school year. The table below shows the Team Champions with the total number of championships won in parentheses, the team runner-up, and the individual champion along with their team.

Championship Records
Currently University of Mary Washington has the most team championships with 11, and Mary Washington and Salisbury University are tied for the most individual champions with 8 each. The table below shows the counts for the number of team championships and individual championships won per team, as well as the years that each team won the team championship.

 Frostburg State, Gallaudet, Hood, Marymount (VA), Penn State Harrisburg, St. Mary's (MD), Stevenson, and Wesley (DE) never won a team or individual men's cross country championship before departing from the conference. 
 Catholic (DC), Goucher, and Southern Virginia all won individual championships but never won a team championship.
 UC Santa Cruz and Pratt have yet to win an individual or team championship.
 Members highlighted in pink are former CAC/C2C members.

Women's Cross Country

Results
The inaugural season of women's cross country was in the 1991-92 school year. The table below shows the Team Champions with the total number of championships won in parentheses, the team runner-up, and the individual champion along with their team.

Championship Records
Currently University of Mary Washington has the most team  and individual championships with 14 and 11 respectively. The table below shows the counts for the number of team championships and individual championships won per team, as well as the years that each team won the team championship.

 Frostburg State, Gallaudet, Hood, Penn State Harrisburg, St. Mary's (MD), Stevenson, and Wesley (DE) never won a team or individual men's cross country championship before departing from the conference. 
 Catholic (DC), Goucher, Marymount (VA), and Southern Virginia all won individual championships but never won a team championship.
 Mills, Mount Mary, UC Santa Cruz and Pratt have yet to win an individual or team championship.
 Members highlighted in pink are former CAC/C2C members.

Field Hockey

Results
The tournament has been held annually since 1991. It is a single-elimination tournament and seeding is based on regular-season records. The tournament winner receives C2C's automatic bid to the NCAA Division III Field Hockey Championship.

 PS indicates that the champion was determined by penalty strokes.
 OT indicates that the champion was determined in over time.

Championship Records

 Frostburg State, Hood, Southern Virginia, and Stevenson never reached the tournament finals as CAC/C2C members.
 Schools highlighted in pink are former CAC/C2C members.

Men's Soccer

Results
The tournament has been held annually since 1991. It is a single-elimination tournament and seeding is based on regular-season records. The tournament winner receives C2C's automatic bid to the NCAA Division III Men's Soccer Championship.

 PK indicates that the champion was determined by penalty kicks.
 OT indicates that the champion was determined in over time.

Championship Records

 Catholic (DC), Frostburg State, Gallaudet, Goucher, Hood, Marymount (VA), Pine Manor, and Southern Virginia never reached the tournament finals as CAC/C2C members.
 UC Santa Cruz, Finlandia, and Pratt have yet to reach the tournament final.
 Schools highlighted in pink are former CAC/C2C members.

Women's Soccer

Results
The tournament has been held annually since 1991. It is a single-elimination tournament and seeding is based on regular-season records. The tournament winner receives C2C's automatic bid to the NCAA Division III Women's Soccer Championship.

 PK indicates that the champion was determined by penalty kicks.
 OT indicates that the champion was determined in over time.

Championship Records

 Gallaudet, Goucher, Hood, Marymount (VA), Southern Virginia, and Wesley (DE) never reached the tournament finals as CAC/C2C members.
 UC Santa Cruz, Finlandia, Mills, Mount Mary, and Pratt have yet to reach the tournament final.
 Schools highlighted in pink are former CAC/C2C members.

Women's Volleyball

Results
The tournament has been held annually since 1991. It is a single-elimination tournament and seeding is based on regular-season records. The tournament winner receives C2C's automatic bid to the NCAA Division III Women's Volleyball Championship.

Championship Records

 Hood, Penn State-Harrisburg, Southern Virginia, and Wesley (DE) never reached the tournament finals as CAC/C2C members.
 UC Santa Cruz, Finlandia, Mills, Mount Mary, and Pratt have yet to reach the tournament final.
 The 2005 and 2006 titles were originally won by Gallaudet but were later vacated due to infractions.
 Schools highlighted in pink are former CAC/C2C members.

Winter Sports

Men's Basketball

 Frostburg State, Gallaudet, Penn State–Harrisburg, Pine Manor, Southern Virginia, and Stevenson never reached the tournament finals as CAC/C2C members. All except Southern Virginia and Pine Manor left the CAC before the 2020 conference rebranding, and Southern Virginia and Pine Manor left C2C in July 2021.
 Finlandia, Pratt, and UC Santa Cruz, all of which joined C2C (then known as the CAC) when it absorbed the American Collegiate Athletic Association in 2020, had been scheduled to play their first C2C seasons in 2020–21. (Two more ACAA members that joined C2C at that time are women's colleges.) 
 Schools highlighted in pink are former CAC/C2C members.

Women's Basketball

Men's Indoor Track & Field

Women's Indoor Track & Field

Spring Sports

Baseball

Men's Lacrosse

Women's Lacrosse

Softball

Men's Tennis

Women's Tennis

Men's Outdoor Track & Field

Women's Outdoor Track & Field

Discontinued Sports

Men's Golf

Women's Golf

Men's Swimming

Women's Swimming

References

Coast to Coast Athletic Conference